Cristina Gutiérrez Herrero (born 24 July 1991) is a Spanish dentist and rally raid driver who in 2017 became the first Spanish female car driver to finish the Dakar Rally. In 2021 she was the second woman to win a stage in Dakar Rally history. She participates in the Extreme E electric cross-country series, driving for Lewis Hamilton's Team X44. In 2021 she won the FIA World Cup for Cross-Country Rallies, becoming the first-ever female driver to win the FIA World Cup for Cross-Country Rallies. In 2022 she won the Extreme-E Championship alongside Sébastien Loeb in Lewis Hamilton's Team X44, making her the first Spanish woman to ever win it. In 2022 she was the first Spanish female to reach the podium of the Dakar Rally, being the third classified in the T3 category. In 2023 Dakar Rally she finished in 4th position after having many issues in the first week that prevented her from fighting for the victory. Nonetheless, she won the prologue of the Dakar Rally  and the last stage which allowed her to finish in 4th position. Cristina currently has 3 stage victories in the T3 category of the Dakar Rally.

Racing career

Early career
Gutiérrez debuted in rally raid in 2010 at age eighteen. She was overall runner-up at the 2015 Spanish Off-Road Rally Championship.

Dakar Rally
Gutiérrez debuted her international rally career in the 2017 Dakar Rally, racing in a modified Mitsubishi Pajero. Gutiérrez's first race was a success. She finished 44th overall and 6th in the T1.S class, in a race where 27% of class entrants did not manage to complete the course. This made her the first woman from Spain to ever finish the off-road classic. In 2018 she finished second in the T1.S class, again driving a Mitsubishi Montero. The Spaniard finished 7th in the T1.2 class in 2019 and 2020, both driving a Mitsubishi Eclipse Cross.

In 2021 Gutiérrez competed in the T3.1 lightweight vehicles category on a OT3-01. She became only the second woman ever (after Jutta Kleinschmidt in 2005) to win a Dakar stage, however she retired in stage 8. Her best result was in 2022, when she and co-driver Francois Cazalet finished 3rd in the Light Prototype (T3) category Driving a Red Bull OT3 prototype. In 2022 she finished third in the T3.1 class, becoming the first Spanish female to ever make it. In 2023 Cristina finished 4th in the T3 category, after having many issues in the first week that prevented her from fighting for the first position. Nevertheless, Cristina won the prologue and the last stage of the rally, being the only woman ever do it so after Jutta Kleinschmidt.

Extreme E
In December 2020 she was announced as the female driver for Lewis Hamilton's Team X44 in Extreme E, partnering with Sébastien Loeb. They finished the season in 2nd behind Rosberg X Racing's Johan Kristoffersson and Molly Taylor. The teams were level on points but RXR were ahead on virtue of their 3 wins to X44's one win.

Loeb and Gutiérrez were re-signed to Team X44 for 2022, for Extreme-E's second season. Team X44, with Gutiérrez and Loeb, ended up winning the second season of Extreme-E championship in the last race.

Other Series
Gutiérrez has also been her country’s Women’s Off-Road Champion since 2012, and outright vice-champion in the same discipline in 2015 following a series of second places in Spanish Bajas. She won six consecutive times in the Women's Class of the Spanish TT Rally Championship.

In 2021 she became the first female driver to win an FIA World Cup for the Cross-Country Rallies title. She completed the last stage with a broken back.

Racing record

Complete Extreme E results
(key)

* Season still in progress.

References

External links
 Cristina Gutiérrez on Instagram

1991 births
Living people
Spanish racing drivers
Dakar Rally drivers
Extreme E drivers
Spanish female racing drivers
Spanish rally drivers
Female rally drivers
20th-century Spanish women
21st-century Spanish women